Eois muscularia is a moth in the  family Geometridae. It is found in Bolivia.

References

Moths described in 1900
Eois
Moths of South America